The 20th Independent Spirit Awards, honoring the best in independent filmmaking for 2004, were announced on February 26, 2005.  It was hosted by Samuel L. Jackson.

Nominees and winners

{| class="wikitable"
!Best Feature
!Best Director
|-
|Sideways

Baadasssss!
Kinsey
Maria Full of Grace
Primer
|Alexander Payne – Sideways
Shane Carruth – Primer
Joshua Marston – Maria Full of Grace
Walter Salles – The Motorcycle Diaries
Mario Van Peebles – Baadasssss!
|-
!Best Male Lead
!Best Female Lead
|-
|Paul Giamatti – Sideways

Kevin Bacon – The Woodsman
Jeff Bridges – The Door in the Floor
Jamie Foxx – Redemption
Liam Neeson – Kinsey
|Catalina Sandino Moreno – Maria Full of Grace
Kimberly Elise – Woman Thou Art Loosed
Vera Farmiga – Down to the Bone
Judy Marte – On the Outs
Kyra Sedgwick – Cavedweller
|-
!Best Supporting Male
!Best Supporting Female
|-
|Thomas Haden Church – Sideways

Jon Gries – Napoleon Dynamite
Aidan Quinn – Cavedweller
Roger Robinson – Brother to Brother
Peter Sarsgaard – Kinsey
|Virginia Madsen – Sideways
Cate Blanchett – Coffee and Cigarettes
Loretta Devine – Woman Thou Art Loosed
Robin Simmons – Robbing Peter
Yenny Paola Vega – Maria Full of Grace
|-
!Best Screenplay
!Best First Screenplay
|-
|Sideways – Alexander Payne and Jim TaylorBaadasssss! – Mario Van Peebles and Dennis Haggerty
Before Sunset – Richard Linklater, Julie Delpy and Ethan Hawke
The Door in the Floor – Tod Williams
Kinsey – Bill Condon
|Maria Full of Grace – Joshua MarstonBrother to Brother – Rodney Evans
Garden State – Zach Braff
Primer – Shane Carruth
Robbing Peter – Mario F. de la Vega
|-
!Best Cinematography
!Best Debut Performance
|-
|The Motorcycle Diaries – Eric GautierDandelion – Tim Orr
Redemption – David Greene
Saints and Soldiers – Ryan Little
We Don't Live Here Anymore – Maryse Alberti
|Rodrigo de la Serna – The Motorcycle Diaries
Anthony Mackie – Brother to Brother
Louie Olivos Jr. – Robbing Peter
Hannah Pilkes – The Woodsman
David Sullivan – Primer
|-
!Best First Feature (Over $500,000)
!Best Documentary
|-
|Garden State

Brother to Brother
Napoleon Dynamite
Saints and Soldiers
The Woodsman
|Metallica: Some Kind of Monster
Bright Leaves
Chisholm '72: Unbought & Unbossed
Hiding and Seeking: Faith and Tolerance After the Holocaust
Tarnation
|-
! colspan="2" | Best International Film
|-
| colspan="2" | The Sea Inside • SpainBad Education • Spain
Oasis • South Korea
Red Lights • France
Yesterday • South Africa
|}

Special awards

John Cassavetes AwardMean Creek
Down to the Bone
On the Outs
Robbing Peter
Unknown Soldier

Truer Than Fiction Award
Born into Brothels
Chisholm '72: Unbought & Unbossed
Control Room
Farmingville

Producers Award
Gina Kwon – The Good Girl, Me and You and Everyone We Know and The Motel
Danielle Renfrew – November and Groove
Sean Covel and Chris Wyatt – Napoleon Dynamite and Think Tank

Someone to Watch Award
Jem Cohen – Chain
Bryan Poyser – Dear Pillow
Jennifer Reeves – The Time We Killed

Special Distinction Award
The ensemble cast of Mean Creek: Rory Culkin, Ryan Kelley, Scott Mechlowicz, Trevor Morgan, Josh Peck and Carly Schroeder

Films with multiple nominations and awards

Films with multiple nominations

Films with multiple wins

References

External links
2004 Spirit Awards at IMDb
Partial broadcast on official YouTube channel

2004
Independent Spirit Awards